The Richmond rifle was a rifled musket produced by the Richmond Armory in Richmond, Virginia, for use by the Confederate States Army during the American Civil War.

Background
At the start of the American Civil War, the Confederacy suffered from a lack of resources with the capability to produce small arms weapons. Virginia appropriated funds to modernize the Old State Armory building in Richmond with arms-making machinery manufactured in England; but the confrontation at Fort Sumter initiated the Union blockade which prevented delivery of the machinery.  In April 1861, the Confederacy led by Thomas Jonathan Jakson captured the Union-held town of Harper's Ferry in western Virginia, and salvaged the machinery used to manufacture Springfield Model 1855 muskets. Confederate troops captured 33,993 black walnut stocks with the machinery. The machinery and stocks were shipped on the Winchester and Potomac Railroad to Winchester, Virginia, where they were transferred by wagons over the Valley Pike to be reloaded onto the Manassas Gap Railroad at Strasburg, Virginia for delivery to Richmond. The rifling machinery was transferred to the Fayetteville Arsenal.

Production history
The Old State Armory building with Harpers Ferry Machinery was transferred to Confederate States control in June 1861. Production began in October 1861 retaining the general form of the Model 1855, but without the Maynard tape primer mechanism and patch box.  The lock plate milling machine was modified in March 1862 to make manual capping easier by lowering the characteristic tape primer hump. Forged iron butt plates were replaced by brass butt plates concurrently with the lock modification.  Most Confederate rifles also differed from the Union rifles they were based on with a different rear sight and brass nosecap.

Gun stock machinery was moved south in response to Union advances; and become operational in the former railway depot at Macon, Georgia in October 1862. Finished stocks were shipped to Richmond by rail. Gun stock production at Macon peaked at two thousand per month in April 1863. Attempts were made to harvest stock blanks in North Carolina when the supply of captured gun stocks was exhausted, but Union sympathizers burned the North Carolina sawmill. Gun stock machinery was evacuated from Macon to avoid Sherman's March to the Sea. Production at Richmond shifted to a  short rifle with a  barrel to use shorter pieces of wood considered unsuitable for normal length rifles until the vanishing wood supply halted production in January 1865.

See also
 Rifles in the American Civil War

References

 Smithsonian Institution

External links
 Antietam on the Web

American Civil War rifles
Richmond, Virginia in the American Civil War
Rifled muskets
Weapons of the Confederate States of America